Euclidia tarsalis is a moth of the family Erebidae found in Sri Lanka.

References

Moths described in 1865
Euclidia